Edmund Jones (April 15, 1918 – September 14, 2019) was an American politician from Pennsylvania who served as a Republican member of the Pennsylvania House of Representatives, District 161 from 1971 to 1974.

Early life and education
Jones was born in Chester, Pennsylvania on April 15, 1918. His family moved to Swarthmore, Pennsylvania in 1930.  

He graduated from Swarthmore High School in 1935. He subsequently obtained a B.A. from Swarthmore College in 1939 and a LL.D. from University of Pennsylvania Law School in 1942.

He then served as a captain in the U.S. Army during World War II in a heavy automotive maintenance company. He was assigned to the war crimes branch in Wiesbaden, Germany. 

After the war, Jones assisted with the Nuremberg War Trials, taking depositions from war crimes witnesses.

Career
Jones practiced law in the Delaware County firm that his grandfather established in 1876.

From 1966 to 1971, Jones served as mayor of Swarthmore, Pennsylvania.  Jones was elected to the Pennsylvania House of Representatives on May 18, 1971 to serve the remainder of the 1971 term after the death of Edward Mifflin in office.  He was reelected in 1972 but lost reelection in 1974 to Peter O'Keefe.

In 1985, Jones was elected to the Swarthmore Borough Authority.  He served from 1985 to 1989 and as the chair of the authority in 1989.  Jones was elected to the Delaware County Council and served from 1987 to 1988.  He served as the chair of the Delaware County Planning Commission from 1988 to 1989.  He served as a board member of the Southeastern Pennsylvania Transportation Authority from 1989 to 1996.

Personal life
In 1941, Jones was married to Adalyn and together they had three daughters and a son.

Jones was a member of the Rotarians for over 70 years, having joined the Chester Rotary Club in 1945.

Jones turned 100 in April 2018 and died in September 2019 in Ridley Park, Pennsylvania.

References

1918 births
2019 deaths
20th-century American politicians
American centenarians
Men centenarians
United States Army personnel of World War II
Mayors of places in Pennsylvania
Republican Party members of the Pennsylvania House of Representatives
Nuremberg trials
Pennsylvania lawyers
People from Chester, Pennsylvania
Military personnel from Pennsylvania
Swarthmore College alumni
University of Pennsylvania Law School alumni
20th-century American lawyers
Delaware County Councilmembers (Pennsylvania)